U.S. Route 19E (US 19E) is a divided highway of US 19 in the U.S. states of North Carolina and Tennessee.  The U.S. Highway, which is complemented by US 19W to the west, travels  from US 19 and US 19W at Cane River, North Carolina, north to US 11E, US 19, and US 19W in Bluff City, Tennessee. US 19E connects Asheville, North Carolina, and Bristol, Tennessee, with Burnsville, Spruce Pine, and Elk Park in North Carolina and Roan Mountain and Elizabethton in Tennessee. US 19E also has an unsigned concurrency with Tennessee State Route 37 (SR 37) for its entire course in Tennessee.

Route description

US 19E begins at its split with US 19 and US 19W at Cane River. US 19 heads west and then south toward Interstate 26 (I-26) and Asheville. The transition from US 19 to US 19E is a seamless transition that treats US 19W as a side route. US 19E heads east towards the towns of Burnsville and Spruce Pine. The highway is an easy drive, as it nears Spruce Pine, it expands to a four-lane that then bypasses the mountain city. US 19E reverts to two-lane once out of city limits, briefly widening to four-lane again after entering Avery county. Once reaching the community of Ingalls, the highway becomes curvy as it follows along the banks of the North Toe River. Most travelers will take turn onto NC 194 (or Mullen Hill Road, a shortcut bypassing Ingalls) as an alternate route towards Elk Park. Passing through several small communities, it eventually reaches the town of Elk Park, where it then proceeds into Tennessee.

From the North Carolina state line, US 19E lazily curves down to Roan Mountain, from which SR 143 heads south toward Roan Mountain State Park and the actual Roan Mountain at the Tennessee-North Carolina border.  Near Hampton, US 19E widens to an expressway and begins to run concurrently with US 321.  At Elizabethton, US 321 splits west toward Johnson City.  At Bluff City, US 19E and US 19W merge back into US 19, heading north to Bristol.

History
Established in 1927, US 19 traversed from the Georgia state line (at Bellview) to the Tennessee state line (at Elk Park), roughly similar to the route seen today.  In 1930, US 19 was truncated at Cane River, where it was split into US 19E and US 19W; US 19E follows the original US 19 routing north. In 1984, US 19E was realigned in Yancey County to its current routing. On November 2, 2012, US 19 and US 19E were widened from I-26 to Jacks Creek Road, just west of Burnsville.  At a cost of $107.9 million, the  two-lane mountain road was upgraded to a four-lane highway, and the first for Yancey County.  Governor Bev Perdue was on hand at the ribbon cutting ceremony opening the highway.

US 19 first appeared in Tennessee in 1927, from the North Carolina state line (near Elk Park) to Bluff City.  Later in the same year, it was extended through Bristol into Virginia.  In 1930, US 19 was truncated at Bluff City, splitting into US 19E along the original route into North Carolina and US 19W going towards Johnson City and then on into North Carolina.  In 1994, a new four-lane expressway was completed between Elizabethton to Bluff City; the abandoned route became Old Bristol Highway in Carter County and Old Elizabethton Highway in Sullivan County.

Future
US 19E from the east end of the four-lane divided highway west of Burnsville to Ingalls is to be widened into a multi-lane highway. The segment through Burnsville to Micaville is scheduled for a July 2015 completion.  The two remaining sections west and east of Spruce Pine is currently subject to reprioritization.

Junction list

See also

 Doe Hill Mountain
 East Tennessee and Western North Carolina Railroad
 Overmountain Victory National Historic Trail
 Pisgah National Forest
 Unaka Range

References

External links

E
19E
19E
19E
Transportation in Yancey County, North Carolina
Transportation in Mitchell County, North Carolina
Transportation in Avery County, North Carolina
Transportation in Carter County, Tennessee
Transportation in Sullivan County, Tennessee